Carlyle Thompson (born October 30, 1988) is a Bahamian sprinter from Nassau, Bahamas who competed in the 400m Hurdles and 400m. He attended St.Annes High School in Nassau, Bahamas, before going on to compete for Allen County Community College and Nova Southeastern University.
He won two silver medals at the 2006 CARIFTA Games first in the open 400m Hurdles then on the third leg of the  Relay.

Personal bests

References

External links
 World Athletics
 NSU Sharks
Thompson 4x 400m Relay Carifta 2006

1988 births
Living people
Bahamian male sprinters
Bahamian male hurdlers
People from Nassau, Bahamas
Sportspeople from Nassau, Bahamas
Nova Southeastern University alumni
Junior college men's track and field athletes in the United States
Nova Southeastern Sharks athletes